GeoBar 4 is the fourth and last local season of the reality show The Bar in Georgia.

Synopsis

Start Date: 13 October 2007.
End Date: 30 December 2007.
Duration: 79 days.
Contestants:
The Finalists: Dea (Winner) & Giorgi (Runner-up).
Evicted Contestants: Ani, Dato, Elene, Irakli, Mulatka, Salome, Teona & Kvava.
Voluntary Exit: Gio.
Ejected: Pako.

Note: Elene was evicted twice; Dea was evicted, re-entered and won.

Contestants

Nominations

2007 television seasons